Joaquín Estévez (born 22 September 1984) is an Argentinian professional golfer who plays on the Challenge Tour and the Tour de las Américas.

Estévez turned pro in 2008 and picked up his first professional win in 2011, the Copa Antioquia, an event sanctioned by the Challenge Tour and the Tour de las Américas.

Professional wins (2)

Challenge Tour wins (1)

1Co-sanctioned by the Tour de las Américas

Challenge Tour playoff record (1–0)

Tour de las Américas wins (1)

1Co-sanctioned by the Challenge Tour

TPG Tour wins (2)

External links

Profile on the Tour de las Americas official site

Argentine male golfers
European Tour golfers
Sportspeople from Bahía Blanca
1984 births
Living people